H.G. Wells' The Food of the Gods, also billed as just The Food of the Gods, is a 1976 science fiction thriller film released by American International Pictures and was written, produced and directed by Bert I. Gordon.

The Food of the Gods starred Marjoe Gortner, Pamela Franklin, Ralph Meeker, Jon Cypher, and Ida Lupino. This film was loosely based on a portion of the 1904 H. G. Wells novel The Food of the Gods and How It Came to Earth. The film reduced Wells' tale to an "Ecology Strikes Back" scenario, common in science fiction movies at the time.

Michael Medved gave it the Golden Turkey Award for "Worst Rodent Movie of All Time".

Plot 
The "food" mysteriously bubbles up from the ground on a remote island somewhere in British Columbia. Mr. and Mrs. Skinner (John McLiam and Ida Lupino) consider it a gift from God, and feed it to their chickens, which grow larger than humans as a result. Rats, wasps, and grubs also consume the substance, and the island becomes infested with giant vermin. One night, a swarm of giant rats kill Mr. Skinner after his car tire is punctured in the forest.

A professional football player named Morgan (Marjoe Gortner) is on the island for a hunting trip with his buddies when one of them is stung to death by giant wasps. After ferrying his friends back to the mainland, Morgan returns to investigate. Also thrown into the mix are Thomas and Rita (Tom Stovall and Belinda Balaski), an expecting couple; Jack Bensington (Ralph Meeker), the owner of a dog food company, who hopes to market the substance; and Bensington's assistant Lorna (Pamela Franklin), a bacteriologist. After Morgan locates and dynamites the giant wasps' enormous nest, he and the others become trapped in the Skinners' farmhouse, surrounded by giant rats. Morgan's friend Brian (Jon Cypher), Bensington, and Mrs. Skinner are killed by the rats.

Morgan blows up a nearby dam, flooding the area and drowning the rats, whose size and weight render them unable to swim. After the waters clear, the survivors pile up the bodies of the rats, spilling the jars of "F.O.T.G." and gasoline on them before burning them. However, several of Mrs. Skinner's jars of "F.O.T.G." are swept away, drifting to a mainland farm. The substance is consumed by dairy cows, and in the film's closing scene, schoolchildren are shown unwittingly drinking the tainted milk, implying that they will also experience abnormal growth.

Cast 
 Marjoe Gortner as Morgan
 Pamela Franklin as Lorna
 Ralph Meeker as Jack Bensington
 Jon Cypher as Brian
 Ida Lupino as Mrs. Skinner
 Belinda Balaski as Rita
 Tom Stovall as Thomas
 John McLiam as Mr. Skinner
 Chuck Courtney as Davis
 Reg Tunnicliffe as ferry attendant

Release 

Reception 
The movie was AIP's most successful release of the year, causing them to make a series of films based on H. G. Wells novels.

Roger Ebert of the Chicago Sun-Times gave the film one star out of four. Vincent Canby of The New York Times called the film "a stunningly ridiculous mixture of science-fiction and horror-film clichés." Gene Siskel of the Chicago Tribune gave the film half of one star out of four and wrote, "The heavy television ad campaign promises six-foot roosters and panther-sized rats. What it should promise, if truth-in-labeling applied to film ads, is rotten special effects and a laughable script." Arthur D. Murphy of Variety wrote, "Too much emphasis by Gordon on his good special visual effects combines with too little attention to his writing chores ... Every player has done better before; this script is atrocious." Kevin Thomas of the Los Angeles Times wrote that "the entire picture is a joke—unintentionally." Tom Milne of The Monthly Film Bulletin called it "A truly appalling piece of s-f horror in which the cretinous dialogue, hopefully illuminating the follies of human greed and tampering with nature, poses more of a hazard to the cast than the crudely animated giant wasps or the monster rat and cockerel heads stiffly manipulated from the wings."

The Food of the Gods was nominated for the Best Horror Film by the Academy of Science Fiction, Fantasy & Horror Films in the 1976 Saturn Awards.

It has a score of 18% at Rotten Tomatoes from 17 reviewers, with an average score of 3.5/10.

Sequel 
A sequel (if only in name) entitled Food of the Gods II was released in 1989.

References

External links 
 The Food of the Gods – Review at AMC
 
 
 

1976 films
1976 horror films
1970s science fiction horror films
American natural horror films
American science fiction horror films
Canadian natural horror films
Canadian science fiction horror films
American International Pictures films
English-language Canadian films
Films about size change
Films based on works by H. G. Wells
Films directed by Bert I. Gordon
Films set on islands
Films set in British Columbia
Films shot in British Columbia
Giant monster films
1970s English-language films
1970s American films
1970s Canadian films